Mount Kyffin in Antarctica is a distinctive reddish-brown mountain,  high, with a sloping spur extending  to the north, at the extreme northern end of the Commonwealth Range, projecting into the east side of Beardmore Glacier and rising precipitously above it.

Discovered by the British Antarctic Expedition, 1907–09, it was named for Evan Kyffin Thomas, one of the proprietors of The Register, an Adelaide newspaper. Kyffin-Thomas was a traveling companion of Ernest Shackleton's on the voyage from England.

References

Mountains of the Ross Dependency
Dufek Coast